Mohs or MoHS can refer to:
Friedrich Mohs, a 19th-century German geologist who developed:
Mohs scale of mineral hardness, a scale used in materials science to describe hardness
Frederic E. Mohs, an American doctor who developed:
Mohs surgery, a microscopically controlled surgery highly effective for common types of skin cancer
Erik Mohs, a German professional racing cyclist
Mohs Automobile, an automobile  built by the American Mohs Seaplane Corporation
Moanalua High School, a public, co-educational college preparatory high school in Hawaiʻi
The Melancholy of Haruhi Suzumiya, a 2006 anime sci-fi television series
Mount Olive High School, a U.S. public high school in Flanders, New Jersey
Ministry of Health and Sports (Myanmar), a ministry of the government of Myanmar

See also 
 Mho, an alternative name for the Siemens (unit)